The 2021 ABA League Second Division Playoffs is the play-off tournament that decides the winner of the 2020–21 ABA League Second Division season. The winner of the play-offs qualifies for the 2021–22 ABA League First Division.

Playoffs format 
Based on the results and position of the clubs in the standings after the regular season, Playoffs will take place with teams from 1st to 8th position. The Quarterfinals will be played in knockout pairs 1–8, 2–7, 3–6, 4–5. The winners of the Quarterfinals will qualify to the Semifinals and the winners of the Semifinals will play the Final.

Qualified teams

Venue
On 3 April 2021, it was announced that the Playoffs will be played in Podgorica, Montenegro.

Bracket

Quarterfinals
All times are local UTC+1.

Borac Banja Luka v Podgorica

Spars v Zlatibor

Mladost MaxBet v MZT Skopje Aerodrom

Studentski centar v Sloboda Užice

Semifinals

Podgorica v Spars

Mladost MaxBet v Studentski centar

Finals

Game 1

Game 2

See also 
 List of current ABA League Second Division team rosters
 2021 ABA League Second Division Playout

2020–21 domestic competitions
  2020–21 Basketball Championship of Bosnia and Herzegovina
  2020–21 Prva A liga
  2020–21 Macedonian First League
  2020–21 Basketball League of Serbia

Notes

References

External links 
 Official website
 ABA League at Eurobasket.com

ABA Second Division seasons
2020–21 in European basketball leagues
2020–21 in Serbian basketball
2020–21 in Bosnia and Herzegovina basketball
2020–21 in North Macedonia basketball
2020–21 in Montenegrin basketball
April 2021 sports events in Europe
May 2021 sports events in Europe
International basketball competitions hosted by Montenegro